The 1976 Sacramento State Hornets football team represented California State University, Sacramento as a member of the Far Western Conference (FWC) during the 1976 NCAA Division II football season. Led by first-year head coach Glenn Brady, Sacramento State compiled an overall record of 2–8 with a mark of 2–3 in conference play, placing in a three-way tie for third place in the FWC. The team was outscored by its opponents 252 to 142 for the season. The Hornets played home games at Hornet Stadium in Sacramento, California.

Schedule

References

Sacramento State
Sacramento State Hornets football seasons
Sacramento State Hornets football